The Sheriff of Clackmannan was historically the office responsible for enforcing law and order in Clackmannan, Scotland and bringing criminals to justice. Prior to 1748 most sheriffdoms were held on a hereditary basis. From that date, following the Jacobite uprising of 1745, the hereditary sheriffs were replaced by salaried sheriff-deputes, qualified advocates who were members of the Scottish Bar.

Following mergers the sheriff became the Sheriff of Clackmannan & Stirling in 1747, Sheriff of Clackmannan & Kinross in 1807 and the Sheriff of Linlithgow, Clackmannan & Kinross in 1865. Following further reorganisation in 1881 Clackmannan became part of the Sheriffdom of Stirling, Dumbarton & Clackmannan.

Sheriffs of Clackmannan

Gille Muire (1164)
Alexander de Stirling (1200-1207)
William Bissett (1303-1304)
Malcolm de Inverpefer (1304-1305)
Henry de Anand (1305-1306)
John de Stirling (1306)
Henry de Anand (1328)
John de Monteith (1353-1382)
William Menteith (1382)
John Menteith (1470)
John Schaw of Alweth (1489)
William Menteith of Kers (1489)
William Livingston (1631)
Thomas Hope, (1638-1651)
 Protectorate
Sir Alexander Hope, (1662–66) (resigned) 
Henry Bruce, (1668-1674)  
David Bruce, (1674–c.1693) (deprived as Jacobite)  
Robert Stewart, (1698)  
William Morrison, (1698-1700)  
 no record, (1700-1712)  
William Dalrymple, (1712–1742)  
William Dalrymple, Earl of Dumfries, (1742–1747)

Sheriffs of Clackmannan and Stirling (1747)
1748 - Clackmannan combined with Stirling
 David Walker, 1748–1761 
 Robert Bruce, 1761–1764  
 George Cockburn (later Haldane), 1764–1770 
Alexander Abercromby, Lord Abercromby, 1770–1780  
 John Pringle, 1780–1790  
 William Tait, 1790–1797  
 David Williamson (later Robertson Ewart), 1797–1807  )

Sheriffs of Clackmannan and Kinross (1807)
 Clackmannan separated from Stirling and combined with Kinross
Sir James Moncreiff, Lord Moncrieff, 1808–1829
John Tait, 1830–1865

Sheriffs of Linlithgow
William St. Clair (1264)
William St. Clair (1290)
James Hamilton, 1st Earl of Abercorn, 1600–
Sir William Hope of Grantown, 1682–1702
Charles Hope, 1702–1742
John Hope, 1742–1747

Sheriffs-Depute (1748)
John Gillon of Wellhouse, 1748–
William Baillie, 1772–1793 
David Hume, 1793–>1808 
Joshua Henry MacKenzie, 1811–?1822 
John Cay, 1822–1865

Sheriffs of Linlithgow, Clackmannan and Kinross, (1865)
John Tait, 1865–1866
George Monro, 1866–1881 
 Sheriffdom divided in 1881 between the three new sheriffdoms of The Lothians, Stirling, Dumbarton & Clackmannan and  Fife & Kinross

See also
 Historical development of Scottish sheriffdoms

References

sheriff
sheriff